aka Torasan, Remind Shiretoke is a 1987 Japanese comedy film directed by Yoji Yamada. It stars Kiyoshi Atsumi as Torajirō Kuruma (Tora-san), Keiko Takeshita as the film's "Madonna", and Toshiro Mifune as Takeshita's father. Tora-san Goes North is the thirty-eighth entry in the popular, long-running Otoko wa Tsurai yo series.

Synopsis
When his travels take him to rural Hokkaido, Tora-san helps a cantankerous old veterinarian (Mifune) in his relationships with his estranged daughter, and a woman in whom he is secretly interested.

Cast
 Kiyoshi Atsumi as Torajirō
 Chieko Baisho as Sakura
 Keiko Takeshita as Rinko
 Toshiro Mifune as Junkichi Ueno
 Keiko Awaji as Etsuko
 Shimojo Masami as Kuruma Tatsuzō
 Chieko Misaki as Tsune Kuruma (Torajiro's aunt)
 Gin Maeda as Hiroshi Suwa
 Hidetaka Yoshioka as Mitsuo Suwa
 Hisao Dazai as Boss (Umetarō Katsura)
 Jun Miho as Akemi
 Gajirō Satō as Genkō
 Chishū Ryū as Gozen-sama
 Issei Ogata as The doctor

Critical appraisal

Toshirō Mifune was nominated for Best Supporting Actor at the Japan Academy Prize for his role in Tora-san Goes North. He won awards for Best Supporting Actor at the Blue Ribbon Awards and the Mainichi Film Award ceremonies. Keiko Awaji was nominated for Best Supporting Actress at the Japan Academy Prize. Stuart Galbraith IV writes that Tora-san Goes North is "funny, charming, and ultimately quite moving". The film unites Mifune and Keiko Awaji who had appeared together forty years earlier in Kurosawa's Stray Dog (1949). Noting that Mifune rarely found a good part in the last two decades of his career, Galbraith judges Tora-san Goes North to be "an utterly charming film that gives the great actor one of his last good roles." Kevin Thomas of the Los Angeles Times states that this entry in the series is a "little tougher-minded and a little less sentimental than usual, which is all to the good" and that Yamada had "created a role ideal for Mifune." The German-language site molodezhnaja gives Tora-san Goes North three and a half out of five stars.

Availability
Tora-san Goes North was released theatrically on August 15, 1987. In Japan, the film was released on videotape in 1996, and in DVD format in 1997, 2002, and 2008.

References

Bibliography

English

German

Japanese

External links
 Tora-san Goes North at www.tora-san.jp (official site)

1987 films
Films directed by Yoji Yamada
1987 comedy films
1980s Japanese-language films
Otoko wa Tsurai yo films
Japanese sequel films
Shochiku films
Films set in Gifu Prefecture
Films set in Hokkaido
Films with screenplays by Yôji Yamada
1980s Japanese films